New Minya is a city in the Minya Governorate, Egypt. The city is located on the right bank of the Nile across from Old Minya. Construction of the planned city began in 1991 and was carried out by the New Urban Communities Authority. Its population was estimated at about 15,677 people in 2018.

References 

Populated places in Minya Governorate
Cities in Egypt
New towns in Egypt